Rex Brough aka King John and the Red King (born 1960 in Meriden, Warwickshire) is an English record producer and editor of radio programmes, mainly for the BBC.

His production work includes UK Top 40 hits for Bomb the Bass, Betty Boo and Definition of Sound. After a brief time as a session musician, mainly for Pookah makes 3, he became live sound engineer for Harvey and the Wallbangers. As a recording engineer, he worked with a variety of people including Sinitta and Slim Gaillard.

Following chart success with Betty Boo and Definition of Sound, he has worked as a freelance digital editor, working on radio comedy shows, mainly for BBC Radio 4, working on the Radio 4 comedy shows Recorded for Training Purposes produced by Adam Bromley, About a Dog written by Graeme Garden, produced by Jon Naismith, and Rudy's Rare Records, starring Lenny Henry.

In the 80's Rex was also the producer of a number of successful albums by the experimental rock group Harvey and the Wallbangers.

References

External links
 Rex Brough's Website

English record producers
English audio engineers
BBC people
1960 births
Living people